Consell ( or ) is a small municipality in the district of Raiguer on Majorca, one of the Balearic Islands, Spain.

References

Municipalities in Mallorca
Populated places in Mallorca